Magodi is a village in Malpur Taluka in Aravalli district of Gujarat state, India.

History
There are three memorial stones, palias, one with the figure of a horseman and another with a worn-out inscription. There is also a black stone called Gok Chuhani with three carved snakes.

References

Notes

Bibliography
 This article incorporates text from a publication now in the public domain: 

Villages in Aravalli district